Metallurgical and Materials Engineering is a peer-reviewed Open Access scientific journal, published by the Association of Metallurgical Engineers of Serbia. The first name of the journal was Metalurgija, published in 1995. The new name was adopted in 2012. The journal publishes contributions on fundamental and engineering aspects in the area of metallurgy and materials.

The journal publishes full length research papers, preliminary communications, reviews, and technical papers.

References

External links

English-language journals
Open access journals
Materials science journals
Publications established in 1995